The Rembau District is a district that is located in the state of Negeri Sembilan, Malaysia. The district is a stronghold of the matrilineal system known as adat perpatih, a customary practice inherited from the Minangkabaus, of Sumatra. The district borders Seremban District to the north, Port Dickson District to the west, Tampin District to the east, Kuala Pilah District to the northeast and Alor Gajah District, Malacca to the southwest. 

Rembau still maintains the old district ruler, which used to be called the district head or Penghulu. Now the title is Yang Teramat Mulia Undang Luak Rembau. He is one of the electors to the throne of Yang di-Pertuan Besar of Negeri Sembilan, besides Sungai Ujong, Jelebu, Johol and Tampin.

Administrative divisions

Rembau District consists of 17 mukims, which are:
 Batu Hampar
 Bongek
 Chembong
 Chengkau
 Gadong
 Kundur
 Legong Hilir
 Legong Hulu
 Miku
 Nerasau
 Pedas
 Pilin
 Selemak
 Semerbok
 Sepri
 Tanjung Keling
 Titian Bintangor

Demographics

Federal Parliament and State Assembly Seats 

List of Rembau district representatives in the Federal Parliament (Dewan Rakyat) 

List of Rembau district representatives in the State Legislative Assembly (Dewan Undangan Negeri)

See also
 Districts of Malaysia

References